Stefan Stam (born 14 September 1979) is a former Dutch footballer who played as a centre back. His previous clubs include AZ, PSV, Eindhoven, AFC, Oldham Athletic, Yeovil Town, Hereford United, FC Den Bosch and Katwijk.

Life and career
Stam was born in Amersfoort. He played for VV Grasshoppers of Hoogwoud before playing for the youth teams of both AZ and PSV. He made his professional debut for Eindhoven and spent two seasons playing for the club in the Eerste Divisie. He moved to England in 2003, signing for Oldham Athletic after a successful trial. He scored one goal in 97 league appearances for Oldham, in a 2–1 win against Rotherham United in September 2006. He was released by Oldham in May 2009, and went on to sign a two-year contract with Yeovil Town the following month. Stam scored his only goal for the club in a 2–1 win against Exeter City in January 2010. Nine months later, he was made available for loan.

He joined Hereford United on loan for a month in March 2011, which was later extended until the end of the season. Following his release by Yeovil, Stam signed a two-year contract with Hereford in July.

References

External links
 Voetbal International profile 

1979 births
Living people
Dutch footballers
Association football defenders
FC Eindhoven players
SV Huizen players
FC Den Bosch players
Oldham Athletic A.F.C. players
Yeovil Town F.C. players
Hereford United F.C. players
VV Katwijk players
Eerste Divisie players
Derde Divisie players
English Football League players
National League (English football) players
Expatriate footballers in England
Sportspeople from Amersfoort
Footballers from Utrecht (province)
Dutch expatriate sportspeople in England
Dutch expatriate footballers